"Hot In It" is a song by Dutch DJ Tiësto and English singer Charli XCX, released on 30 June 2022 through Musical Freedom and Atlantic Records as the fourth single from Tiësto's upcoming seventh studio album Drive. It marks the pair's first direct collaboration, with Tiësto having previously remixed Charli's 2012 collaboration with Icona Pop, "I Love It", and her 2014 single "Break the Rules".

Background
Charli XCX first teased the song on her social media accounts in May 2022, sharing a snippet of the chorus in a video posted to her TikTok. Tiësto stated that he knew the song would be a "smash" when he first heard Charli's vocals on the recording, and also said that it was "amazing to see how everyone has been reacting to the message of the song".the song was nominated for dance song of the year at iHeartRadio music awards 2023

Reception
Tom Breihan of Stereogum called the song a "short dance-pop track with a brittle Tiësto beat and lyrics about overcoming a breakup by hitting the dancefloor and looking good", writing that Charli sings about "rockin' it, droppin' it, shaking her ass, no stoppin' it" in the chorus.

Rankings

Commercial performance
On the midweek UK Singles Chart dated 18 July 2022, the song was number 24. On 12 July 2022, the song debuted at number 85 on the Canadian Hot 100.

Credits and personnel
 Tiësto – producer
 Charli XCX – vocals
 Goldfingers – producer
 Tim Deal – keyboards, programming
 Bart Schoudel – vocal production
 Tom Norris – mixing

Charts

Weekly charts

Monthly charts

Year-end charts

Certifications

References

2022 singles
2022 songs
Atlantic Records singles
Charli XCX songs
Songs written by Charli XCX
Songs written by Tiësto
Tiësto songs